The Atlantic Pilotage Authority Canada is a Crown corporation of the Government of Canada, which was established as a result of recommendations made by the Royal Commission on Pilotage in Canada, by the Pilotage Act, Section 18, on February 1, 1972 mandated to assist in pilotage in all Canadian waters in and around the provinces of New Brunswick, Prince Edward Island, Nova Scotia and Newfoundland and Labrador.

Criticism 

In 2016, the Auditor General of Canada panned the authority, criticizing it for economic losses driven by artificially low pilotage rates, failed upkeep of corporate systems, lack of strategic planning, and issues with conflict of interest.

References 

Canadian federal Crown corporations
Transport companies established in 1972
Water transport in New Brunswick
Water transport in Newfoundland and Labrador
Water transport in Nova Scotia
Water transport in Prince Edward Island
1972 establishments in Nova Scotia